The 2019 GP Miguel Induráin was the 66th edition of the GP Miguel Induráin cycle race and was held on 6 April 2019 as part of the 2019 UCI Europe Tour. The race started and finished in Estella. The race was won by Jonathan Hivert.

Teams
Eighteen teams were invited to take part in the race. These included four UCI WorldTeams, nine UCI Professional Continental teams, and five UCI Continental teams.

UCI WorldTeams

 
 
 
 

UCI Professional Continental Teams

 
 
 
 
 
 
 
 
 

UCI Continental Teams

 
 Guerciotti–Kiwi Atlantico
 Lokosphinx

Results

References

2019
2019 UCI Europe Tour
2019 in Spanish road cycling